Archer is a relatively new and still sparsely populated suburb in the southwestern part of Palmerston. It is 25 km SE of the Darwin CBD and 5.4 km from Palmerston City. Its local government area is the City of Palmerston. Archer is the largest suburb of Palmerston by area.

It is named after James C. Archer.

References

External links
https://web.archive.org/web/20110629040718/http://www.nt.gov.au/lands/lis/placenames/origins/greaterdarwin.shtml#a#a

Suburbs of Darwin, Northern Territory